P. P. Sumod  is an Indian politician from Kerala, who is currently serving as the MLA of Tarur constituency since May 2021.

References 

Kerala MLAs 2021–2026
Communist Party of India (Marxist) politicians from Kerala
Year of birth missing (living people)
Living people